was a town located in Yūfutsu (Iburi) District, Iburi Subprefecture, Hokkaido, Japan.

As of 2004, the town had an estimated population of 5,267 and a density of 34.07 persons per km2. The total area was 154.61 km2.

On March 27, 2006, Hayakita was merged with the town of Oiwake (also from Yufutsu (Iburi) District) to create the new town of Abira.

External links
 Abira official website 

Dissolved municipalities of Hokkaido